This is a list of members of the 2nd Lok Sabha arranged by state or territory represented. These members of the lower house of the Indian Parliament were elected to the 2nd Lok Sabha (1957 to 1962) at the 1957 Indian general election.

Andhra Pradesh

Assam

Bihar

Bombay State

Delhi

Gujarat

Haryana

Himachal Pradesh

Jammu and Kashmir

Karnataka

Kerala

Madhya Pradesh

Madras State

BOMBAY STATE

Manipur

Mysore State

Odisha

Punjab

Rajasthan

Tamil Nadu

Tripura

Uttar Pradesh

Uttarakhand

West Bengal

References

List
2